Benjamin John is a Papua New Guinean rugby league and rugby union footballer who has played in the 2000s and 2010s.

Playing career
John played rugby league in the SP Inter-City Cup before switching to rugby union sevens and playing for Papua New Guinea on the Sevens World Series.

In 2010 John returned to rugby league and moved to Australia, playing for the Parkes Spacemen in the Group 11 Rugby League competition.

John first represented Papua New Guinea in rugby league in 2007 against France. In 2010 he was selected in the team that competed in the Four Nations, playing in all three matches.

In 2014 he played for Bathurst St Patrick's in the Group 10 Rugby League competition.

References

Living people
Male rugby sevens players
Papua New Guinea national rugby league team players
Papua New Guinean rugby league players
Papua New Guinean rugby union players
Parkes Spacemen players
Place of birth missing (living people)
Rugby league halfbacks
Year of birth missing (living people)